The Barnadi (Bornadi) River  is in the State of Assam in India.

In British India, the river separated the Kamrup district and Darrang district. It originates from the Bara/Boro/Bada River.

References 

Rivers of Assam
Rivers of India